Tryphanidae is a family of amphipods belonging to the order Amphipoda.

Genera:
 Tryphana Boeck, 1871

References

Amphipoda